Iceland is divided into 6 constituencies for the purpose of selecting representatives to parliament.

History
The current division was established by a 1999 constitution amendment and was an attempt to balance the weight of different districts of the country whereby voters in the rural districts have greater representation per head than voters in Reykjavík city and its suburbs. The new division comprises three countryside constituencies (NW, NE and S) and three city constituencies (RN, RS and SW). The imbalance of votes between city and country still exists and a provision in the election law states that if the number of votes per seat in parliament in one constituency goes below half of what it is in any other constituency, one seat shall be transferred between them. This has occurred twice, in the elections in 2007 and 2013. On both occasions, a seat was transferred from the Northwest constituency to the Southwest constituency.

Composition
The constituencies are the following:

Data for the table below is current as of the 2017 election:

Notes

References 
"Apportionment of Seats to Althingi, the Icelandic Parliament" (PDF). National Electoral Commission of Iceland. 2013. Retrieved 1 August 2015.

See also
Administrative divisions of Iceland
Geography of Iceland
Municipalities of Iceland
Regions of Iceland

External links

 Article on Alþingi website

 
Government of Iceland
Subdivisions of Iceland
Iceland politics-related lists
Iceland